Carroll County High School is a secondary school located at 1706 Highland Ave in the city of Carrollton, Kentucky, United States. It is part of the Carroll County Public Schools (Kentucky) district.

References

Schools in Carroll County, Kentucky
Public high schools in Kentucky
Carrollton, Kentucky